Seis Hermanas is a Spanish soap opera produced by Bambú Producciones for Televisión Española that originally aired on La1 from April 22, 2015 to April 21, 2017. It starred María Castro, Carla Díaz, Mariona Tena, Celia Freijeiro, Marta Larralde and Candela Serrat.

Synopsis 
The series is set in Madrid, Spain from 1913 to 1917 and tells the story of the six Silva sisters: Adela Silva (Celia Freijeiro), the older sister, makes most of the decisions, she is correct, generous, loving and kind, she is a widow, she believes that love will never knock on her door again, Blanca Silva (Mariona Tena), she is beautiful, classist, kind, elegant and educated, engaged to the rich banker Rodolfo Loygorri (Fernando Andina), but in love with her brother-in-law, the doctor Cristóbal Loygorri (Álex Gadea), Diana Silva (Marta Larralde), she has a strong character, replaces her father at the head of the Silva family factory, is the enterprising sister, believes that women are undervalued and, although she does not count on finding the love of her life, her destiny has different plans for her, Francisca Silva (María Castro), she sings in secret at the Ambigú but her dream is to sing for a more select audience, Celia Silva (Candela Serrat), she loves letters, studied teaching and her dream is to continue studying, writing and seeing the world. Later she discovers that she feels a feeling of love for her friend Petra; and Elisa Silva (Carla Díaz), is the little sister, spoiled, irascible and immature, she dreams of finding a man of good position with whom she can start a family. The six sisters go from being upper-class women without any concern to running the textile factory and the businesses of their father, Don Fernando Silva, after his sudden death, in a society in which women have no right to vote.

Cast

Protagonists 
 María Castro as Doña Francisca Silva Torrealba de Gutiérrez, Condesa de Barnos
 Carla Díaz as Elisa Silva Torrealba
 Celia Freijeiro as Doña Adela Silva Torrealba Vda. de Sáez y Rivera
  as Doña Blanca Silva Torrealba de Loygorri, Baronesa de Loygorri, Lady-in-waiting of Victoria Eugenie of Battenberg, the Queen consort of Spain
 Marta Larralde as Doña Diana Silva Torrealba de Montaner, Marquesa de Fuensanta
 Candela Serrat as Celia Silva Torrealba

Main cast 
 Emilio Gutiérrez Caba as Don Fernando Silva Santos
 Fernando Andina as Rodolfo Loygorri del Amo
 Marta Torné as Victoria Villacieros
 Vicky Peña as Rosalía Manzano de Fuentes
 Kiti Mánver as Dolores del Amo Vda. de Loygorri
 María Hervás as Inés Villamagna
 Fernando Guillén Cuervo as Aurelio Buendía
 María Cotiello as Soledad Silva Guzmán/Úrsula Gorán/Úrsula Gorán de Gutiérrez
 Álex Gadea as Cristóbal Manuel Loygorri del Amo, Barón consorte de Loygorri
 Álex Adróver as Salvador Montaner, Marqués de Fuensanta
 Jorge Clemente as Carlos "Carlitos" Terán
  as Don Ricardo Silva Santos
  as Adolfina Torrealba López
  as Gabriel Gutiérrez Rivera, Conde de Barnos
  as Germán Rivera
 Nuncy Valcárcel as María de las Mercedes "Merceditas" Oviedo
 Joaquín Climent as Benjamín Fuentes
  as Enrique Gutiérrez
  as Antonia Rivera Vda. de Gutiérrez
 Carlota Olcina as Petra Fuentes Martínez
 Alejandro Cano as Miguel Esparza
  as Luis Civantos
  as Bernardo Angulo
  as Sofía Álvarez de Terán
 Mario Alberto Díez as Basilio Ruiz
  as Raimundo Ferreiro
 Eva Almaya as Marina Montero
  as Inspector Federico Velasco Doménech
 Leticia Etala as Bruna de Velasco
 Adrián Lamana as Ciro Altabás
 Eva Manjón as Amalia "La Cachetera" Jordán de Loygorri
 Ana Mayo as Beatriz Vinuesa
  as Emilio Sánchez
 Oriol Puig as Gonzalo Silva
 José Bustos as Simón Goris
  as Aurora Alarcón Marco
  as Carmela "Camelita" Silva Manzano/Carolina García/Carolina García Rivera/Carolina Silva Manzano de Rivera
 Marian Arahuetes as Catalina
 María Isasi as Elpidia

Participations 
 Raúl Alberto Mediero Rodríguez as Factory Employee (Episodes 338-344)

See also
 Radiotelevisión Española
 Television in Spain

References

External links
 Seis Hermanas Website
 Seis Hermanas at the Internet Movie Database

Spanish television soap operas
La 1 (Spanish TV channel) network series
2015 Spanish television series debuts
2017 Spanish television series endings
Spanish-language television shows
Spanish LGBT-related television shows
Television series set in the 1910s
2010s Spanish drama television series
Television shows set in Madrid
Television series by Bambú Producciones